Masquerade is a post-punk band from Finland, formed in late 2012. They have made television appearances on Finnish channels Yle Teema and MTV3, and appeared on Helsingin Sanomat. They have toured United States of America, Japan, Brazil, Mexico, and in numerous European countries. In August 2016, Masquerade signed on Danse Macabre Records.

In June 2017, the band played at Wave-Gotik-Treffen, one of the largest dark alternative music festivals in the world.

Band members
Suzi Sabotage – vocals
Jacques Saph – bass
William Freyermuth – drums, percussion

Discography
 demo (August 2013)
 Blood is the New Black, EP, (October 2014)
 Ritual, LP, (15 July 2016)
 Ritual, CD, (14 October 2016)
 Where Nobody Can Hear You Scream (13 November 2018)

Music videos
 Needle Through a Bug, (October 2013)
 All Things Hurt, (June 2014)
 Panic Paranoia, (December 2015)
 Deathmarch, (December 2016)
 Too Depressed to Dance, (June 2017)
 Russian Roulette, (August 2018)

References

External links

Masquerade at Discogs

Finnish post-punk music groups
Finnish gothic rock groups
Musical groups established in 2012
Musical groups from Helsinki